The Hood's Texas Brigade Monument is an outdoor memorial commemorating members of John Bell Hood's Texas Brigade of the Confederate Army installed on the Texas State Capitol grounds in Austin, Texas, United States. The monument was sculptured by Pompeo Coppini and erected in 1910. It is topped by a bronze statue of a Confederate soldier.

Content
On its shaft is the Texas State Flag crossed with the "Blood-Stained Banner" version of the Confederate Flag. Below it are the initials for the Confederate States of America, CSA. The base has quotes praising the Texas Brigade from the President of the Confederacy, Jefferson Davis, Commander of the Confederate Army, Robert E. Lee and Confederate General, Stonewall Jackson.

See also

 1910 in art
 List of Confederate monuments and memorials

References

External links
 

1910 establishments in Texas
1910 sculptures
Bronze sculptures in Texas
Confederate States of America monuments and memorials in Texas
Granite sculptures in Texas
Monument, Texas Brigade
Outdoor sculptures in Austin, Texas
Sculptures of men in Texas
Statues in Texas
Monument, Hood